The Indian locomotive class WL of 1955 was a class of light axle load 4-6-2 "Pacific" type steam locomotives used on  broad gauge lines in India between 1955 and 1995.  A total of 109 of them were built in two batches.

The first batch, of 10 engines, was built by Vulcan Foundry in Newton-le-Willows, Lancashire, England, in 1955.  The second, main, batch, totalling 94 engines, was built in India by the Chittaranjan Locomotive Works between 1966 and 1969.

The WL class of 1955 is not to be confused with the WL class of 1939, all of which went to Pakistan upon partition in 1947. The two classes bore no resemblance to each other according to Vulcan.

Preservation

See also

Rail transport in India#History
Indian Railways
Locomotives of India
Rail transport in India

References

Notes

Bibliography

External links

Chittaranjan Locomotive Works locomotives
Railway locomotives introduced in 1955
WL (1955)
Vulcan Foundry locomotives
4-6-2 locomotives
5 ft 6 in gauge locomotives
Passenger locomotives